Martič is a Slovenian surname. Notable people with the surname include:

 Zoran Martič (born 1965), Slovenian basketball coach
 Zvezdan Martič (born 1963), Slovenian journalist and engineer

See also
 Martić

Slovene-language surnames